Swan Esther is a musical based on the Book of Esther.

It was written in 1982 by Jack Edward Oliver (words) and Nick Munns (music).

A professional production was staged by the Young Vic in January 1984. Swan Esther has also been performed by a number of amateur companies.

The original soundtrack was published on CD in May 2014 on the Stage Door record label.

References

1982 musicals
Amateur theatre
Cultural depictions of Esther
British musicals
Musicals based on the Bible